In computing, a memory module or RAM (random-access memory) stick is a printed circuit board on which memory integrated circuits are mounted. Memory modules permit easy installation and replacement in electronic systems, especially computers such as personal computers, workstations, and servers. The first memory modules were proprietary designs that were specific to a model of computer from a specific manufacturer. Later, memory modules were standardized by organizations such as JEDEC and could be used in any system designed to use them.

Types of memory module include:
 TransFlash Memory Module
 SIMM, a single in-line memory module
 DIMM, dual in-line memory module
 Rambus memory modules are a subset of DIMMs, but are normally referred to as RIMMs
 SO-DIMM, small outline DIMM, a smaller version of the DIMM, used in laptops
 Compression Attached Memory Module, thinner than SO-DIMM

Distinguishing characteristics of computer memory modules include voltage, capacity, speed (i.e., bit rate), and form factor.
For economic reasons, the large (main) memories found in personal computers, workstations, and non-handheld game-consoles (such as PlayStation and Xbox) normally consist of dynamic RAM (DRAM). Other parts of the computer, such as cache memories normally use static RAM (SRAM). Small amounts of SRAM are sometimes used in the same package as DRAM. However, since SRAM has high leakage power and low density, die-stacked DRAM has recently been used for designing multi-megabyte sized processor caches.

Physically, most DRAM is packaged in black epoxy resin.

General DRAM formats

Dynamic random access memory is produced as integrated circuits (ICs) bonded and mounted into plastic packages with metal pins for connection to control signals and buses. In early use individual DRAM ICs were usually either installed directly to the motherboard or on ISA expansion cards; later they were assembled into multi-chip plug-in modules (DIMMs, SIMMs, etc.). Some standard module types are:
 DRAM chip (Integrated Circuit or IC)
 Dual in-line Package (DIP/DIL)
 Zig-zag in-line package (ZIP)
 DRAM (memory) modules
 Single In-line Pin Package (SIPP)
 Single In-line Memory Module (SIMM)
 Dual In-line Memory Module (DIMM)
 Rambus In-line Memory Module (RIMM), technically DIMMs but called RIMMs due to their proprietary slot.
 Small outline DIMM (SO-DIMM), about half the size of regular DIMMs, are mostly used in notebooks, small footprint PCs (such as Mini-ITX motherboards), upgradable office printers and networking hardware like routers.
 Small outline RIMM (SO-RIMM). Smaller version of the RIMM, used in laptops. Technically SO-DIMMs but called SO-RIMMs due to their proprietary slot.
 Compression Attached Memory Module (CAMM), a proprietary Dell format which they expect to be adopted as a standard.
 Stacked vs. non-stacked RAM modules
 Stacked RAM modules contain two or more RAM chips stacked on top of each other. This allows large modules to be manufactured using cheaper low density wafers. Stacked chip modules draw more power, and tend to run hotter than non-stacked modules.  Stacked modules can be packaged using the older TSOP or the newer BGA style IC chips. Silicon dies connected with older wire bonding or newer TSV.
 Several proposed stacked RAM approaches exist, with TSV and much wider interfaces, including Wide I/O, Wide I/O 2, Hybrid Memory Cube and High Bandwidth Memory.

Common DRAM modules
Common DRAM packages as illustrated to the right, from top to bottom (last three types are not present in the group picture, and the last type is available in a separate picture):
 DIP 16-pin (DRAM chip, usually pre-fast page mode DRAM (FPRAM))
 SIPP 30-pin (usually FPRAM)
 SIMM 30-pin (usually FPRAM)
 SIMM 72-pin (often extended data out DRAM (EDO DRAM) but FPRAM is not uncommon)
 DIMM 168-pin (most SDRAM but some were extended data out DRAM (EDO DRAM))
 DIMM 184-pin (DDR SDRAM)
 RIMM 184-pin (RDRAM)
 DIMM 240-pin (DDR2 SDRAM and DDR3 SDRAM)
 DIMM 288-pin (DDR4 SDRAM)

Common SO-DIMM DRAM modules:
 72-pin (32-bit)
 144-pin (64-bit) used for SO-DIMM SDRAM
 200-pin (72-bit) used for SO-DIMM DDR SDRAM and SO-DIMM DDR2 SDRAM
 204-pin (64-bit) used for SO-DIMM DDR3 SDRAM
 260-pin  used for SO-DIMM DDR4 SDRAM
 262-pin  used for SO-DIMM DDR5 SDRAM

References 

Computer memory
Modularity